The 2004 The Citadel Bulldogs football team represented The Citadel, The Military College of South Carolina in the 2004 NCAA Division I-AA football season.  John Zernhelt served as head coach for the first season.  The Bulldogs played as members of the Southern Conference and played home games at Johnson Hagood Stadium.

Schedule
The Bulldogs first game of the season, against Charleston Southern was cancelled due to Hurricane Gaston.

References

Citadel Bulldogs
The Citadel Bulldogs football seasons
Citadel football